is a passenger railway station in the city of  Kamogawa, Chiba Prefecture, Japan, operated by the East Japan Railway Company (JR East).

Lines
Emi Station is served by the Uchibo Line, and is located 111.4 kilometers from the terminus of the Uchibō Line at Soga Station.

Station layout
Emi Station has two opposed side platforms serving two tracks connected by a footbridge. The station is a Kan'i itaku station operated by the Japan Post Service. The station building is also a post office.

Platform

History
Emi Station was opened on December 20, 1922. The station was absorbed into the JR East network upon the privatization of the Japan National Railways (JNR) on April 1, 1987.

Passenger statistics
In fiscal 2018, the station was used by an average of 80 passengers daily (boarding passengers only).

Surrounding area
 Mount Karasuba

See also
 List of railway stations in Japan

References

External links

JR East Station information  

Railway stations in Chiba Prefecture
Railway stations in Japan opened in 1922
Uchibō Line
Kamogawa, Chiba